Dato' Mohd Khusairi Abdul Talib (20 January 1961 – 15 July 2020) was a Malaysian politician. He was a four-term Perak State Assemblyman for the Slim constituency from 2004 to 2020. Mohd Khusairi was also a United Malays National Organisation (UMNO) Supreme Council Member and chairman of the National Film Development Corporation (FINAS).

Election results

Honours
  :
  Knight Commander of the Order of the Perak State Crown (DPMP) - Dato' (2005)

Death
Mohd Khusairi died at the age of 59 in Bentong Hospital after a heart attack while playing golf at the Awana Genting Highlands Golf & Country on 15 July 2020. He was buried the next day in Islamic Cemetery Felda Sungai Behrang.

External links

References

1961 births
2020 deaths
Malaysian people of Malay descent
Malaysian Muslims
People from Perak
United Malays National Organisation politicians